The Tibetan dwarf hamster (Cricetulus alticola) is a species of rodent in the family Cricetidae.

Description
The head and neck are a pale sandy ochre color and the body is a slightly darker and uniform shade of ochre. The underparts and the upper surfaces of the feet are white. The ears are a darker shade of brown, contrasting with the body-colour, and have pale rims at their tip and a small tuft of white hairs at their base. The tail is bicoloured, being dark on the upper surface and white below.

Distribution and habitat
The Tibetan dwarf hamster is native to northern parts of southern Asia and parts of southwestern China. It is likely that it is present at these sorts of altitudes in intervening locations along the Himalayan range. It occupies an assortment of different habitats including coniferous and birch forests, desert steppes, shrubland, swampy grassland and Alpine meadow.

Behaviour
The behaviour of the Tibetan dwarf hamster is thought to be similar to that of the Kam dwarf hamster (Cricetulus kamensis) which is active both day and night. Some authorities think it is synonymous with T Kamensis. It digs a simple burrow that may extend  beneath the surface of the ground and which includes nesting areas and chambers to store food for use in winter. It forages for grain and seeds and also eats insects. Breeding takes place in the summer, litter size being usually between five and ten young.

References

Musser, G. G. and M. D. Carleton. 2005. Superfamily Muroidea. pp. 894–1531 in Mammal Species of the World a Taxonomic and Geographic Reference. D. E. Wilson and D. M. Reeder eds. Johns Hopkins University Press, Baltimore.

Cricetulus
Mammals described in 1917
Taxa named by Oldfield Thomas
Rodents of China
Rodents of India
Mammals of Nepal
Fauna of Tibet
Taxonomy articles created by Polbot